Deoxymethoxetamine (3'-methyl-2-oxo-PCE, DMXE, 3D-MXE) is a recreational designer drug from the arylcyclohexylamine family, with dissociative effects. It is an analogue of methoxetamine where the 3-methoxy group has been replaced by methyl. It has been sold online since around October 2020, and was first definitively identified by a forensic laboratory in Denmark in February 2021.

See also 
 3-Methyl-PCP
 3-Methyl-PCPy
 Hydroxetamine
 Fluorexetamine
 Methoxetamine
 Methoxieticyclidine
 MXiPr

References 

Arylcyclohexylamines
Designer drugs
Dissociative drugs
Secondary amines
Ketones